Akinlolu Richard Olamide Famewo (born 9 November 1998) is an English professional footballer who plays as a centre-back for EFL League One club Sheffield Wednesday.

Coming through the youth academy at Luton Town, he turned professional with The Hatters in 2016 and went on to spend time on loan with Grimsby Town, before signing with Norwich City where played in the Premier League. He went on to feature for St Mirren and Charlton Athletic before signing for Wednesday in 2022.

Career

Luton Town
Born in Lewisham, Greater London, Famewo joined Luton Town as an under-10 and progressed through the club's youth system. He was a member of the under-18 team that won the Youth Alliance South East title and the Youth Alliance Cup in 2015–16, and also reached the quarter-finals of the FA Youth Cup, in which they lost 1–0 to Blackburn Rovers.

Famewo signed his first professional contract on 18 July 2016 at the start of the second year of his scholarship. He was named in the matchday squad for the first time on 10 August for Luton's 3–1 win at home to newly relegated Championship club Aston Villa in the EFL Cup first round, but remained an unused substitute. Famewo made his professional debut on 16 August as an 86th-minute substitute for Jordan Cook in a 2–1 win at home to Newport County. His first start came on 30 August in Luton's 2–1 win away to Gillingham in the EFL Trophy and made his first league start in a 1–1 draw away to Hartlepool United on 27 September. After Famewo's full league debut, manager Nathan Jones said "He was outstanding and he's going to be a top player. He has all the attributes and he's ours and we're proud of him". Famewo missed much of the rest of the campaign due to injury, but he returned to Luton's matchday squad as an unused substitute for the final part of the season and finished 2016–17 with six appearances.

Famewo signed a one-year extension to his contract on 6 July 2018 to keep him at the club until June 2020, and joined League Two club Grimsby Town on a season-long loan. He was recalled by Luton on 29 January 2019, having made 12 appearances for Grimsby.

Norwich City
Famewo signed for Championship club Norwich City on 29 January 2019 on a one-and-a-half-year contract for an undisclosed fee.

He was loaned to Scottish Premiership club St Mirren on 8 January 2020 until the end of the 2019–20 season. Famewo joined newly relegated League One club Charlton Athletic on 26 September 2020 on loan for the 2020–21 season. Charlton re-signed Famewo on a season-long loan on 8 July 2021, with the option of a permanent transfer.

However, this option was not taken up and Famewo rejoined Norwich City at the end of the 2021-22 season following their relegation back to The Championship.

Sheffield Wednesday
On 6 July 2022, Famewo joined Sheffield Wednesday for an undisclosed fee. He made his debut away to Milton Keynes Dons on 6 August 2022, but it would be cut short by a serious-looking injury. Following Wednesday’s EFL Cup win against Sunderland, manager Darren Moore confirmed Famewo would be out for some considerable time. He would return to the first-team squad against Derby County on 3 December.

Personal life
Born in England, Famewo is of Nigerian descent.

Career statistics

References

External links
Profile at the Norwich City F.C. website

1998 births
Living people
Footballers from Lewisham
English footballers
English people of Nigerian descent
Association football defenders
Luton Town F.C. players
Grimsby Town F.C. players
Norwich City F.C. players
St Mirren F.C. players
Charlton Athletic F.C. players
Sheffield Wednesday F.C. players
English Football League players
Scottish Professional Football League players
Premier League players
Black British sportspeople